Ari Kattainen (born 1958) is a Finnish orienteering competitor. He received a bronze medal in the relay event at the 1989 World Orienteering Championships in Skövde, together with Keijo Parkkinen, Peter Ivars and Reijo Mattinen.

See also
 List of orienteers
 List of orienteering events

References

1958 births
Living people
Finnish orienteers
Male orienteers
Foot orienteers
World Orienteering Championships medalists